Adgaon BK is a village in Telhara taluka in Akola district of Maharashtra State, India. It belongs to the Vidarbha region of Maharashtra, and to the Amravati division of Maharashtra. The Battle of Argaon, in the Second Anglo-Maratha War, was named after the village.

References 

Villages in Akola district